The following are notable people who were either born, raised or have lived for a significant period of time in Pristina.

List 

Edon Zhegrova, football player
Shpend Ahmeti, politician
Dua Lipa, singer and songwriter
Rita Ora, singer and songwriter
Behgjet Pacolli, politician and businessman
Albin Kurti, politician and activist
Burim Myftiu, Visual Artist, Curator and Photographer
Zana Krasniqi, model
Ardian Bujupi, singer and songwriter
Aida Baraku, singer, composer, journalist and producer
Tony Dovolani, dancer and instructor
Marigona Dragusha, model
Glauk Konjufca, politician
Enver Petrovci, actor, writer and director
Lorik Cana, former professional football player
Deni Avdija, basketball player
Zufer Avdija, former basketball player
Shkëlzen Shala, entrepreneur and veganism activist
Kadri Prishtina, politician and activist
Gazmend Pula, Kosovar-Albanian intellectual, human rights campaigner, and ambassador

Pristina